Mimanalo Rural LLG is a local-level government (LLG) of Eastern Highlands Province, Papua New Guinea.

Wards
01. Zomaga
02. Ifiyufa
03. Nokondi
04. Kabiufa No. 2

References

Local-level governments of Eastern Highlands Province